The following are notable people who were either born, raised or have lived for a significant period of time in Durrës:

Historical figure

 Anastasius I, Emperor of the Byzantine Empire
 Aretes of Dyrrachium, natural philosopher.
 Jahja Ballhysa, signatory of the Albanian Declaration of Independence
 Pietro Bianco, pirate from Durrës who lived in the 1450s
 Bruti family, Medieval family which ruled in Durres.
 Abaz Efendi Çelkupa, signatory of the Albanian Declaration of Independence
 Mustafa Hanxhiu, signatory of the Albanian Declaration of Independence
 Karl Topia, Prince of Albania
 Nikollë Mekajshi, early 17th century Albanian patriot.

Politics and public office

 Pjetër Arbnori, "the Mandela of the Balkans"
 Vangjush Dako, Mayor of Durrës
 Namik Dokle, politician and former Chairman of the Parliament of Albania from September 2001 to April 2002
 Grida Duma, female politician
 Lefter Koka, former Mayor of Durrës, politician, and former minister
 Fatmir Mediu, politician, leader of Republican Party of Albania
 Bujar Nishani, politician and former President of Albania
 Gazmend Oketa, politician, former minister
 Sokol Olldashi, politician, former minister
 Nako Spiru, high-ranking official of the Communist Party of Albania and Minister of Economy and Industry from 1946 to 1947
 Ferdinand Xhaferraj, former Minister of Tourism, Cultural Affairs, Youth and Sports

Athletics, sports and recreation

Football
A–H

 Arbër Aliu
 Artan Jazxhi, professional footballer
 Dritan Babamusta
 Haxhi Ballgjini
 Shyqyri Ballgjini
 Gentian Begeja
 Fabian Beqja
 Safet Berisha
 Niko Bespalla
 Mario Dajsinani
 Alfred Deliallisi
 Arbër Deliu
 Enkeleid Dobi
 Niko Dovana
 Bajram Fraholli
 Jurgen Goxha
 Nazmi Gripshi
 Fatmir Hima
 Bledar Hodo
 Altin Hoxha
 Fabio Hoxha
 Rustem Hoxha
 Sulejman Hoxha
 Klejdi Hyka

I–R

 Skënder Jareci
 Elvis Kabashi
 Dejvid Kapllani
 Edmond Kapllani
 Xhevahir Kapllani
 Artan Karapici
 Elton Koça
 Bledar Mançaku
 Gentian Manuka
 Kristi Marku
 Rexhep Memini
 Mikaela Metalla
 Agim Murati
 Stavri Nica
 Alfred Osmani
 Panajot Pano
 Armand Pasha
 Ermir Rezi
 Bledjan Rizvani

S–Z

 Arlis Shala
 Klaidi Shala
 Orges Shehi
 Shaqir Stafa
 Guido Tepshi
 Mario Teqja
 Edlir Tetova
 Rejnaldo Troplini
 Artan Vila
 Emiljano Vila
 Lorenco Vila
 Andi Xhixha

Other
 Mirela Manjani, athlete
 Kreshnik Qato, boxer
 Erald Dervishi, chess player
 Shkëlqim Troplini, wrestler

Art, photography, architecture
 Andrea Alessi, architect
 Ibrahim Kodra, painter
 John Koukouzelis or Jan Kukuzeli, Byzantine music composer
 Kristaq Rama, sculptor, art educator and the father of the Albanian PM, Edi Rama
 Helidon Xhixha, sculptor

Literature, journalism, filmography
 Avni Resuli, actor and director.
 Elvira Dones, novelist, screenwriter, and documentary film producer.
 Moikom Zeqo, writer, archaeologist.

Scholars, science, academicians
 Jera Kruja, Professor of Neurology, Rector of the University of Medicine, Tirana
 Leonik Tomeu, professor of Nicholas Copernicus at the University of Padova

Religion and clergy 

 Saint Astius of Durrës, martyr and Bishop of Dyrrhachium
 Pal Engjëlli, cardinal, clergyman, scholar, and Archbishop of Durrës
 Dom Nikollë Kaçorri, signatory of the Albanian Declaration of Independence
 Nikollë Mekajshi, Franciscan Roman Catholic, bishop of Stephanium
Jan Kukuzeli, Medieval Albanian Christian composer

Others 
 Ilir Hoti, economist and banker.
 Ina Rama, Magistrate, former Chief Prosecutor
 Hygerta Sako, former Miss Albania

References 

Durrës